Peter Attia (born 19 March 1973) is a Canadian-American physician known for his medical practice that focuses on the science of longevity. He is also the first person to make the round-trip swim from Maui and Lanai.

Career
Peter Attia was born on 19 March 1973 in Toronto, Ontario, Canada. He is of Coptic Egyptian descent. First wanting to become a professional boxer, he later attended Queen's University, receiving B.Sc. degrees in mechanical engineering and applied mathematics. He attended Stanford University School of Medicine, where he received his M.D. After medical school, Attia spent five years at the Johns Hopkins Hospital in Baltimore, Maryland as a general surgery resident. He spent two years at the National Cancer Institute (NCI) at National Institutes of Health (NIH), in Bethesda, Maryland as a surgical oncology fellow under Steven Rosenberg. As his residency drew to a close, Attia joined the consulting firm McKinsey & Company in the Palo Alto office as a member of the Corporate Risk Practice and Healthcare Practice. Attia co-founded and served as President of Nutrition Science Initiative (NuSI) with Gary Taubes in 2012.
In 2014, Attia founded Attia Medical, PC, a medical practice focusing on the applied science of longevity and optimal performance. He was one of the speakers at TEDMED 2013.

Attia has a chapter giving advice in Tim Ferriss' book Tools of Titans.

See also
 Laura and John Arnold Foundation

References

Living people
1973 births
21st-century Canadian physicians
Queen's University at Kingston alumni
Stanford University School of Medicine alumni
Canadian people of Coptic descent
American people of Coptic descent
Canadian people of Egyptian descent
People from Toronto
Physicians from Ontario